A  is a miniature sculpture, originating in 17th century Japan. Initially a simply-carved button fastener on the cords of an  box,  later developed into ornately sculpted objects of craftsmanship.

History 

 and  declined as Japanese clothes were gradually westernized from the Meiji period (1868–1911). Since they were popular among Western collectors at that time, the higher the quality of their works, the more they were exported, and now, the higher the quality of their works, the more they are in museums or private collectors in foreign countries than in Japan.

Today, the production of  continues, and some modern  can command high prices in the UK, Europe, the USA, Japan and elsewhere. Inexpensive yet faithful reproductions are available in museums and souvenir shops.

Etymology 
In American English, the word is usually italicized, while it is usually unitalicized in British English.

Forms

Materials 

 Ivory – the most common material used before ivory from live animals became illegal.  made from mammoth ivory (huge quantities still exist in the Near East and Siberia) fill part of the tourist trade demand today.
 Boxwood, other hardwoods – popular materials in Edo Japan and still used today
 Metal – used as accents in many  and  lids
 Hippopotamus tooth – used today in lieu of ivory
 Boar tusk – mostly used by Iwami carvers
 Rhinoceros horn
 Clay/porcelain
 Lacquer
 Cane (woven)

Unusual materials
 Hornbill ivory: of the many species of hornbill, only the helmeted hornbill (Rhinoplax vigil) furnishes an ivory-like substance. This is a dense, carvable substance that makes up the solid casque growing above the upper mandible (from the bird's forehead). It is not ivory, horn, nor bone, yet it has been called ivory for many centuries. It is softer than real ivory and is a creamy yellow in color, becoming red at the top and sides.
 : a species of black coral with dense texture, concentric growth rings, and amber and reddish colored inclusions in the black material. True coral, however, is a hard calcareous substance secreted by marine polyps for habitation. , on the other hand is a colony of keratinous antipatharian marine organisms." According to Bushell, "In color, black coral, is black or blackish brown, sometimes showing streaks of light brown or dirty yellow." Bushell goes on: "As material,  is more acceptable to collectors than carvers. Leading carvers naturally avoided the material. It was prone to crack, crumble or chip. Carvers find that it is risky for carving details and subtle effects. Perfect pieces of black coral were difficult to obtain."
 : there are several definitions, some contradictory: According to Bushell, " is a partially fossilized wood, having the general appearance of ebony but showing no grain." Often called fossilized wood,  is not properly a wood, but a "jet" (a variety of lignite), that is often confused with ebony. It is a shiny material that takes an excellent polish, but it has a tendency to split.  is petrified wood formed when cedar and pine trees from the Tertiary Age (5 million years ago) were buried underground and then carbonized. The layers of earth where  can be found extend under the Aobayama and Yagiyama sections of Sendai, Japan. Pieces made from this material are generally dark brown with a beautiful wood grain and the soft luster of lacquer.
 Walrus tusk: walrus have two large tusks (elongated canine teeth) projecting downward from the upper jaw. These tusks, often reaching two feet in length, have been extensively carved as ivory for centuries in many countries and especially in Japan. Walrus tusk carvings are usually easy to identify, because much of the interior of the tooth is filled with a mottled, almost translucent substance that is harder and more resistant to carving than the rest of the tooth.
 Baleen: the sperm whale has teeth running the whole length of its enormous lower jaw. Those in the middle tend to be the largest, often obtaining a length of more than six to eight inches. These larger ones are often used by carvers of scrimshaw.
 Whale's bone: all bones are hollow, the cavity being filled with a spongy material. Cuts across some bone show a pattern of minute holes looking like dark dots. Lengthwise, such bone displays many narrow channels which appear to be dark lines of varying lengths. Polished, bone is more opaque and less shiny than ivory.

 Tagua nut: the nut from the ivory palm (Phytelephas aequatorialis), often referred to as vegetable ivory. Part of the nut's shell sometimes remains on  carvings. Though often mistaken for or deceptively sold as elephant ivory, items made from the two-to-three-inch nut have none of the striations common to animal ivory, and sometimes the ivory-like nut flesh has a light yellow cast under a rough coconut-shell-like external covering. The nut is very hard when dry, but easily worked into artistic items when wet.
 Walnut (or  – natural walnut shell): in the above photo, a rare example of the  style, the meat from the nut was removed by various means, one being the insertion of a small worm in a hole in the nut to consume the meat. Following that, elaborate designs were carved, and the string inserted. The carver often removed all of the nut's normal surface features and carved through the surface in places to create a latticed effect. Once carved, the resulting  was polished and shellacked.
Bamboo  are either a piece of the stem or the root with carving on it." According to Bernard Rosett: "carvings in the round are usually made from the underground stem of the plant, that small almost solid zone that connects to the creeping rhizome below the ground. Bamboo  are not commonly encountered. Occasionally, one comes across a  fashioned from bamboo root and can revel in the wonderful texture and patina of the material."
 Agate: a mineral, streaked with many colors, and which can be given a high polish.
 Ivorine: a material made from the dust created when carving legally obtained new ivory, mammoth ivory, tusks, and teeth, which is then mixed with a clear resin and compressed as it hardens. This was one of the many solutions to the demand of the tourist market trade for  carvings after trade in new ivory became illegal. Once hard and dry, ivorine can be carved in exactly the same way as ivory. Though often deceptively sold to the modern tourist trade as elephant ivory, items made from ivorine have none of the striations common to animal ivory, though sometimes, the carving is artificially aged to have the yellowed appearance common to true old ivory carvings.

Subjects 
Like many other art forms,  reflect the nature of the society that produced them. As a result,  display every aspect of Japanese culture, including its rich folklore and religion, crafts, trades, and professions, all types of people and creatures, both real and imagined, and every kind of object. As in other aspects of Japanese culture, the subjects portrayed by  trend, over the long term, away from an initial emphasis on motifs of Chinese derivation toward a focus on objects of more strictly national interest.

 People – famous and anonymous, current, historical, real and fictitious, children, warriors, priests, etc.
 Craft, trades, professions – often depicting actions (fishermen catching fish, woodcutters cutting wood), or examples (i.e., a stylized apple for an orchardist or apple merchant)
 Animals – zodiac animals and others. It is worth noting that traditional  style depicts octopus figures as having a tube-like siphon protruding from the "face", similar to a mouth. If one examines closely, one will find that some octopuses have nine tentacles instead of eight. These octopi will usually be found embracing beautiful women.
 Plants or plant products – small ones, such as beans or chestnuts, are often carved actual size.
 Deities and mythical creatures – often from Chinese mythology and religion, and Seven Lucky Gods, are the seven gods of good fortune in Japanese mythology and folklore.
 Non-living things – the smallest category. Common examples include roof tiles, coins, and tools.
 Abstract –  patterns and other designs.
 Sexual –  may depict a male and female in sexual conjugation or may contain only subtle or symbolic sexual references.

Some  represent single, simple, objects, and some depict entire scenes from history, mythology, or literature.

Artists 

It was published in Osaka in 1781 by Inaba Tsūryū. Some works of art are even illustrated in it.

His pieces can be found in many collections and achieve high prices at auctions.

 
 
 
 
 
 
 
 
 
 
 
 
 
 
 
 
 
 
 
 
 
 
 
 
 
 
 
 
 
 
 
 
 
 
 
 
 
 
 
 
 
 
 
 
 
 
 
 
 
 
 
 
 

Seiyōdō Tomiharu (1733–1810) was founder of the Iwami school of carving.

Museum collections 
The Metropolitan Museum of Art, the Los Angeles County Museum of Art, the Toledo Museum of Art, the British Museum, and the Victoria and Albert Museum have many .

In Kyoto, Japan, there is the Kyoto Seishu Netsuke Art Museum, which is the only  specialized art museum in Japan. This museum is a traditional Japanese samurai residence built in the late Edo period. It has a collection of over 5,000  and 400 of them are on display and change every 3 months. The collection focuses on modern works, but there are also works from the Edo period.

The Tokyo National Museum has a small exhibition room dedicated to displaying 50 of the 500 contemporary  works collected by the Prince and Princess Takamado. They were donated by Go who was concerned that too many  were exported from Japan and they were rarely seen in Japan. To mark its 150 year anniversary, the Tokyo National Museum simultaneously exhibited all 274 works from the Go collection from November 2, 2022 to January 22, 2023 and all 500 works from the Prince Takamado collection from November 15, 2022 to December 25, 2022.

In popular culture 
  are a central theme in The Hare with Amber Eyes, a 2010 memoir by British ceramic artist Edmund de Waal. The book traces the history of a collection of 264 —some of them by well-known craftsmen—which were taken to France in the late 19th century, and purchased by a wealthy art collector who was a member of the Jewish Ephrussi family. They were passed down through the family's Vienna branch, where a family servant kept them hidden during the Holocaust when the Nazis confiscated the family's other possessions.

See also 
 Daruma doll
 , the carvers of 
 , the cord fasteners of 
 , a traditional Japanese drawstring bag
 Chatelaine
 Reticule (handbag)
 , a pipe-shaped writing set
 Japanese handicrafts
 Gothic boxwood miniature
 , small and purely decorative sculptures, often made by the same artists who produced

References

External links

 International Netsuke Society This organization publishes a journal for collectors and holds international meetings bi-annually. The Society's web site shows examples of different styles. Others can be found by searching the Internet.
 Isaac Kaplan Netsuke Collection. The South African Jewish Museum's collection of over 600 netsuke. The museum's permanent exhibit displays over 200 netsuke from the 17th-19th centuries.
 Japanese Netsuke History and background on various types of netsuke
 Netsuke thumbnail gallery with detailed images at the Bolton Museum web site
 KYOTO SEISHU NETSUKE ART MUSEUM There are many excellent collection that mainly of contemporary pieces, but with some beautiful antique netsuke as well.
Netsuke: masterpieces from the Metropolitan Museum of Art, an exhibition catalog from The Metropolitan Museum of Art (fully available online as PDF)
 Sumo: Netsuke and Okimono: From the collection of Karl-Ludwig Kley, an online catalogue of Sumo themed Netsuke.

 
Japanese art terminology
Japanese crafts